Kunie Miyaji (born 1891) was a pioneering woman physician in Japan.

Life
Kunie Miyaji was born 1 March 1891 in Suzaki, Kōchi Prefecture. She was educated at high school in Kochi and at boarding school, graduating 1909. She then studied at Tokyo Women's Medical School, graduating in 1914 but staying there for two more years training in gynecology. From 1916 to 1919 she practiced medicine in Burma. Returning home, she married Katsuro Miyaji and did further gynecological study at Kyushu University. She opened a practice and built a medical hospital in her home town of Kochi. She helped form the Japanese Women's Medical Association. She returned to study in the late 1930s, gaining a PhD from Tokyo Imperial University School of Medicine in 1945.

References

1891 births
Year of death missing
19th-century Japanese physicians
Japanese women physicians
Japanese gynaecologists
People from Kōchi Prefecture

19th-century women physicians